Saint Sophia Church may refer to:

 Saint Sophia Church, Moscow, church in Moscow, Russia
 Saint Sophia Church (Nakhchivan-on-Don),  church in Nakhchivan-on-Don, Rostov-on-Don city, Russia
 Church of Saint Sophia, Ohrid, church in Ohrid, North Macedonia
 Saint Sophia Church, Sofia, church in Sofia, Bulgaria

See also 
 Sophia of Rome#Churches, for churches named after Saint Sophia of Rome
 Sofia Church (disambiguation)
 List of churches dedicated to Holy Wisdom